Peter Toms may refer to:

Peter Toms (painter)
Peter Toms (politician)